Rozanne Zingale is an American film editor and producer known for her work in feature films with director Albert Pyun. She resides in Ohio with her husband.

Selected filmography 

 Algiers (announced)
 Deceptions (1990) 
 Cyborg (1989)
 Journey to the Center of the Earth (1988)
 Aloha Summer (1988) (assistant editor)
 Vicious Lips (1986)
 Wired to Kill (1986) (assistant editor)
 That's Life (1986) (assistant editor)
 The Ladies Club (1986) (assistant editor)
 Radioactive Dreams (1985) (assistant editor)

References 

American film editors
American women film editors
1961 births
Living people
21st-century American women